Hans Blum might refer to:
 Hans Blum (journalist), (1841–1910), German journalist
 Hans Blum (musician), (born 1928), German musician